2002 in the Philippines details events of note that happened in the Philippines in the year 2002.

Incumbents

 President – Gloria Macapagal Arroyo (Lakas-CMD)
 Vice President – Teofisto Guingona, Jr. (Lakas)
 Senate President – Franklin Drilon
 House Speaker – Jose de Venecia, Jr.
 Chief Justice – Hilario Davide
 Philippine Congress – 12th Congress of the Philippines

Events

February 
 February 26 – Former Pres. Estrada admits signing ₱500 million Jose Velarde bank account in Equitable-PCI Bank.

March 
 March 6 – An earthquake strikes Mindanao, killing at least 12 people. The world's sixth most powerful of the year, it originates near the Cotabato Trench and registers a magnitude of 7.5.

May 
 May 31 – Hostage crisis in Philtranco Bus Terminal in Malibay, Pasay occurs at dawn which lasted for two hours and ended with the death of both the 4-year-old boy, Dexter Balala, and the drugged knife-wielder, Diomedes Talbo. The young victim was stabbed 13 times by the suspect while the police tried to conduct a rescue attempt, which then failed. The policemen shot the suspect, however, they also hit the boy five times including one bullet which pierced his heart.

June 
 June 7 – A rescue operation for the remaining Abu Sayyaf captives, held since 2001, is launched by the Special Forces of the Armed Forces of the Philippines (AFP) in an area in Zamboanga del Norte; with a gun battle resulting in the deaths of Martin Burnham and Ediborah Yap; only Gracia Burnham survived.
 June 18–19 – At least 16 members of the Philippine Benevolent Missionaries Association, as well as two from the government forces, die in an overnight clash with combined forces who has raided the Ecleo family mansion in San Jose, then part of Surigao del Norte, in their attempt to arrest the cult leader Ruben Jr. A fugitive accused in few murder cases, Ecleo surrenders on the 19th.
 June 21 – Leader of the extremist Abu Sayyaf, Abu Sabaya, is killed by soldiers of the Philippine Army.

July 
 July 15 – Synchronized Barangay and Sangguniang Kabataan (SK) elections are held for the first time in the Philippines upon effect of Republic Act No. 9164 which was approved on March 19, 2002, by the 12th Congress of the Philippines.

August 
 August 21–22 – Abu Sayyaf kidnaps six Filipino members of a Christian group, two of them later beheaded.

October 
 October 2 – A bomb blasts in front of a Malagutay district karaoke bar near a military arms depot in Zamboanga City killed an American Green Beret commando and three Filipino civilians. At least 25 other people, one of them another American trooper, are wounded in the blast.
 October 17 – Two TNT bombs explode around noon inside a shopping centre in the commercial district of Zamboanga City, when the mall was most busy, killing at least seven and wounding about 150 people. Two department stores are destroyed in the attack.
 October 18 – All establishments and offices across the country inspect for bomb scares.
 October 21 – A Philippine Marine guarding the church is killed and 18 others were wounded after a bomb, placed in bag left at a candle store, exploded at Fort Pilar, a Catholic shrine in Zamboanga City.

Holidays

As per Executive Order No. 292, chapter 7 section 26, the following are regular holidays and special days, approved on July 25, 1987. The EDSA Revolution Anniversary is proclaimed this year as a special non-working holiday. On November 13, Republic Act No. 9177 declares Eidul Fitr as a regular holiday. Note that in the list, holidays in bold are "regular holidays" and those in italics are "nationwide special days".

 January 1 – New Year's Day
 February 25 – EDSA Revolution Anniversary
 March 28 – Maundy Thursday
 March 29 – Good Friday
 April 9 – Araw ng Kagitingan (Bataan and Corregidor Day) 
 May 1 – Labor Day
 June 12 – Independence Day 
 August 25 – National Heroes Day
 November 1 –  All Saints Day
 November 30 – Bonifacio Day
 December 5 – Eidul Fitr
 December 25 – Christmas Day
 December 30 – Rizal Day
 December 31 – Last Day of the Year

In addition, several other places observe local holidays, such as the foundation of their town. These are also "special days."

Television

Sports
 May 26 – The Purefoods TJ Hotdogs pulls off a rare seven-game sweep after outclassing Alaska Aces, 91–76, in the 2002 PBA Governors' Cup Finals at the Araneta Coliseum.
 September 20 – The Red Bull Thunder seals their second championship title in the 2002 PBA Commissioner's Cup Finals against the Talk 'N Text Phone Pals in seven games.
 September 29–October 14 – The Philippines participates in the 2002 Asian Games held in Busan, South Korea. The country ranks 18th with three gold medals, seven silver medals and 16 bronze medals with a total of 26 over-all medals.
 October 5 – University Athletic Association of the Philippines men's division finals: The Ateneo Blue Eagles defeats the De La Salle Green Archers to end their 4-year title streak and the school wins their first title in 14 years back in 1988.
 December 25 – Coca Cola Tigers wins their 1st PBA title with a 3–1 series victory over the Alaska Aces as history was made on Christmas Day with the Tigers becoming the first team to win a championship in their very first season.

Births
 January 8 – Andi Abaya, actress
 January 13 – Ayanna Misola, actress
 January 28 – Janine Berdin, actress and singer
 February 22 – Roseanne Magan, singer and actress
 February 28 – Ylona Garcia, actress and singer
 March 16 – Franchesca Salcedo, actress
 April 5 – Golden Cañedo, singer
 April 9 – SAB, singer-songwriter
 April 21 – Carl and Clarence Aguirre, conjoined twins
 April 29 – Karina Bautista, actress and housemate
 May 3 – KD Estrada, actor and singer
 May 11 – Kai Sotto, basketball player
 May 15 – Shanaia Gomez, actress
 May 16
 Shayne Sava, actress
 Angela Ken, singer-songwriter and actress
 June 10 – Belle Mariano, actress
 July 9 
 Seth Fedelin, actor
 Jhanlo Mark Sangiao, mixed martial artist 
 July 18 – Ogie Escanilla, actor and dancer
 August 6 – Bailey May, actor and singer
 August 16 – Reiven Umali, Tawag ng Tanghalan Season 5 grand champion
 August 31 – Gabb Skribikin, member of MNL48
 September 3:
 Bugoy Cariño, actor
 Kyline Alcantara, actress and singer
 September 17 – Will Ashley, actor
 September 24
 Vince Crisostomo, actor
 Anji Salvacion, actress and singer
 October 6 – Dale Baldillo, Filipino child actor and model
 November 23 – Allen Ansay, actor
 November 26 – Coleen Trinidad, member of MNL48
 December 13 – AC Bonifacio, dancer, singer and actress

Deaths
 January 8 – Fely Franquelli, Filipino dancer, choreographer, and actress (b. 1916)
 March 29 – Rico Yan, Filipino matinee idol, model and actor (b. 1975)
 March 31 – Lucio San Pedro, Filipino composer and teacher (b. 1913)
 April 2 – Levi Celerio, Filipino composer and lyricist. (b. 1910)
 April 4 – Jack Tanuan, basketball player (b. 1965)
 June 21 – Abu Sabaya, Abu Sayyaf leader and extremist in Mindanao (b. 1962)
 July 22 – Sumilang Bernardo, former Solicitors in the Office of the Solicitor General (b. 1909)
 August 1 – Francisco Arcellana, Filipino writer, poet, essayist, critic, journalist and teacher (b. 1916)
 September 1 – Martin Urra, Filipino basketball player (b. 1931)
 September 22 – Paco Gorospe, Filipino painter (b. 1939)
 October 22 – Nonoy Marcelo, Filipino cartoonist (b. 1939)
 November 1 – Eduardo Decena, Filipino basketball player (b. 1926)
 November 18 – Zaldy Zshornack, Filipino actor. (b. 1937)
 December 3 – Santiago Bose, mixed-media artist (b. 1949)

Unknowned Deaths
 Rafael Barretto, Filipino basketball player (b. 1931)

References

 
2002 in Southeast Asia
Philippines
2000s in the Philippines
Years of the 21st century in the Philippines